The City Park Practice Track or City Park Track is a 400-meter polyurethane track located in City Park in New Orleans. It was originally built as the practice/auxiliary track for the 1992 U.S. Olympic Track & Field Trials for the 1992 Summer Olympics. The track which is located adjacent to Tad Gormley Stadium, was renovated in 2006.  

It is home to the Jesuit Blue Jays, 2021 XC state champions, and the University of New Orleans]]. The facility is also used during track and field meets held at Tad Gormley Stadium. The track is the finish line for the Crescent City Fall Classic road race. It is also the practice facility for the New Orleans Halfmoons rugby club.

References

External links
 New Orleans City Park

Athletics (track and field) venues in New Orleans
Rugby union stadiums in New Orleans
Sports venues completed in 1992
1992 establishments in Louisiana